Earl Cairns is a title in the Peerage of the United Kingdom. It was created in 1878 for the prominent lawyer and Conservative politician Hugh Cairns, 1st Baron Cairns. He was Lord High Chancellor of Great Britain in 1868 and from 1874 to 1880. Cairns had already been created Baron Cairns, of Garmoyle in the County of Antrim, in 1867, and was made Viscount Garmoyle, in the County of Antrim, at the same time he was given the earldom. These titles are also in the Peerage of the United Kingdom.

He was succeeded by his second but eldest surviving son, the second Earl. He died young without male issue and was succeeded by his younger brother, the third Earl. He never married and was succeeded by his younger brother, the fourth Earl. On his death the titles passed to his second but only surviving son, the fifth Earl. He was a Rear-Admiral in the Royal Navy. , the titles are held by his son, the sixth Earl, who succeeded in 1989.

Sir William Cairns, half-brother of the first Earl, served as Governor of Queensland from 1875 to 1877.

The family seat is Bolehyde Manor, near Chippenham, Wiltshire.

Barons Cairns (1867)
Hugh McCalmont Cairns, 1st Baron Cairns (1819–1885) (created Earl Cairns in 1878)

Earls Cairns (1878)
Hugh McCalmont Cairns, 1st Earl Cairns (1819–1885)
Arthur William Cairns, 2nd Earl Cairns (1861–1890)
Herbert John Cairns, 3rd Earl Cairns (1863–1905)
Wilfred Dallas Cairns, 4th Earl Cairns (1865–1946)
David Charles Cairns, 5th Earl Cairns (1909–1989)
Simon Dallas Cairns, 6th Earl Cairns (born 1939)

The heir apparent is the present holder's eldest son, Hugh Sebastian Frederick Cairns, Viscount Garmoyle (born 1965).

Male-line family tree

Notes

References

Kidd, Charles, Williamson, David (editors). Debrett's Peerage and Baronetage (1990 edition). New York: St Martin's Press, 1990, 

Earldoms in the Peerage of the United Kingdom
Noble titles created in 1878
Noble titles created for UK MPs
Peerages created for the Lord High Chancellor of Great Britain